Kangirsuk (in Inuktitut: ᑲᖏᕐᓱᖅ/Kangirsuq, meaning "the bay") is an Inuit village in northern Nunavik, Quebec, Canada. The community is only accessible by air (Kangirsuk Airport) and, in late summer, by boat. The village used to be known also as Payne Bay and Bellin.

Geography
A rocky cliff to the north and a large, rocky hill to the west partially surround the village.

Climate
Kangirsuk has a tundra climate (ET), characterized by long, cold winters and short, but cool and rainy summers with chilly nights.

History

In the 11th century the area was possibly visited by Vikings. Not far from the village on Pamiok Island, Thomas E. Lee, an archaeologist from Université Laval, discovered a stone foundation of what he identified at the time to be a Viking long house. More recent archaeological investigations have identified the site as being part of the Dorset culture.

Inuit have hunted and fished along the Ungava Bay coast for centuries. Permanent European settlement did not occur until 1921 when the Revillon Frères company set up a trading post here, named Payne River (now the Arnaud River) in memory of Frank F. Payne, who explored the region during the winter of 1885–1886. Four years later, the competing Hudson's Bay Company also set up a post. The Inuit remained nomadic however and only visited the site as a summer encampment because of the abundance of game.

In 1945, the location was known as Payne Bay. In 1959, the federal day school was founded. From then on permanent settlement by Inuit finally began. In 1961, the federal government provided healthcare facilities, housing, and social services. That same year, the Quebec Government decided to give French names to places of the northern Quebec coast and changed the name of the post to Francis-Babel, in honour of Louis-François Babel (1826-1912). But this name did not take root, and was replaced a year later with Bellin, named after Jacques-Nicolas Bellin (1703-1772). It was subsequently known as Bellin (Payne) until 1980. That year, the name was changed to Kangiqsuk when the village was incorporated as a Northern Village Municipality. Local authorities disagreed with this transliteration, and in 1982 it was corrected to Kangirsuk.

Since 1996, the police services in Kangirsuk are provided by the Kativik Regional Police Force. 

The community is depicted in the 2019 short film Throat Singing in Kangirsuk (Katatjatuuk Kangirsumi).

Demographics 

Population trend:
 Population in 2021: 561 (2016 to 2021 population change: -1.1%)
 Population in 2016: 567 
 Population in 2011: 549 
 Population in 2006: 466
 Population in 2001: 436
 Population in 1996: 394
 Population in 1991: 351

Education
The Kativik School Board operates the Sautjuit School.

Flora and fauna
Payne Bay and the Arnaud River are renowned for its excellent mussel harvesting. Numerous nearby lakes and rivers provide an abundance of Arctic char and lake trout.

On the islands of Kyak Bay and Virgin Lake located to the east and north-east of Kangirsuk, respectively, important colonies of eider ducks nest every year.

References

External links

 Northern Village of Kangirsuk

Inuit communities in Quebec
Hudson's Bay Company trading posts
Road-inaccessible communities of Quebec